Augustus Henry Eden Allhusen  (1867 – 2 May 1925) was an English Conservative Party politician. He sat in the House of Commons from 1897 to 1906.

Life
He was son of Henry Christian Allhusen. Born in Gateshead, he was educated at Cheltenham College and at Trinity College, Cambridge (matriculated 1887, B.A. 1890).

He was commissioned in 1900 as a 2nd Lieutenant in the 1st Newcastle upon Tyne (Western division, Royal Garrison Artillery) Volunteers and later served as a lieutenant in the 2nd Royal Bucks Regiment of Yeomanry and as a Justice of the Peace for Buckinghamshire.
He was elected at a by-election in January 1897 as the Member of Parliament (MP) for Salisbury, following the resignation of the Conservative MP Edward Hulse.
He did not contest Salisbury at the 1900 general election, when he was elected as the MP for Hackney Central.
He was defeated at the 1906 general election, and did not stand again.

He was appointed as a Deputy Lieutenant of Buckinghamshire in January 1897, and was High Sheriff of Buckinghamshire in 1913.

Family
In 1897 he married Mary Dorothy Osma, daughter of Lieut.-Col. John Constantine Stanley and his wife Susan Elizabeth Mary Stewart-Mackenzie, a hostess and politician better known under her later name as Mary Jeune, Baroness St Helier.

References

External links 
 

1867 births
1925 deaths
Alumni of Trinity College, Cambridge
Conservative Party (UK) MPs for English constituencies
Deputy Lieutenants of Buckinghamshire
Hackney Members of Parliament
High Sheriffs of Buckinghamshire
People educated at Cheltenham College
Royal Buckinghamshire Yeomanry officers
UK MPs 1895–1900
UK MPs 1900–1906
Volunteer Force officers